Hurler is a wooden roller coaster located at Carowinds amusement park in Charlotte, North Carolina. A second installation of the ride was also built at Kings Dominion, and both locations opened to the public in 1994. Hurler at Kings Dominion was closed following the 2015 season. It was renovated by Rocky Mountain Construction and re-emerged as a steel coaster in 2018 called Twisted Timbers.

History
On September 9, 1993, Carowinds announced that they would be receiving an  themed area based on the Wayne's World films. This new area would feature a variety of restaurants and stores. In addition, the centerpiece attraction would be a wooden roller coaster named Hurler. It was billed as the first movie-themed wooden roller coaster in the United States. That same month, Kings Dominion announced that they would be getting their own Wayne's World section and a Hurler clone.

Both installations of Hurler opened in 1994. The Kings Dominion location first opened for a special preview on April 28, 1994. On hand for the coaster's inaugural ride were Wayne and Garth impersonators, as well as Tia Carrere, who played Wayne's love interest Cassandra Wong in the films. Less than two months later on June 4, the Carowinds location would officially open to the general public. The coasters originally borrowed their theme from the films, whose main characters frequently used the word "hurl." Paramount sold both parks in 2006, and new owner Cedar Fair retained the name but removed references to Wayne's World.

During the 2013-2014 off-season, the Carowinds location received a retracking from Great Coasters International. Hurler closed again for part of the 2014 season for regular maintenance. In March 2016, a "closure" notice was posted on the park's website and published on the park map indicating that the ride would not operate at all throughout the season. The website cited "extensive maintenance" as the reason. A video released in October 2016 on King Dominion's Facebook homepage announced that Hurler's closure was permanent, showing a headstone with its name and years of operation (1994–2016). The video ended with a teaser stating "for now", indicating it may be refurbished and reopened. In August 2017, the park confirmed that Hurler would re-emerge as a hybrid roller coaster called Twisted Timbers in 2018.

Ride layout

Riders are hoisted up an  lift hill and make a wide turn before reaching the initial drop. During the drop, an on-ride camera automatically takes photographs of passengers. The ride continues with a wide, heavily banked, flat turn, then a series of airtime hills and more banked turns. The overall layout is a standard paperclip arrangement with two out-and-back style runs (at Kings Dominion this extended into the courtyard adjacent to Grizzly).

Hurler is also a mirror image of Thunder Run at Kentucky Kingdom.

Theming
Originally, the queue wound underneath the coaster through a "hot set" on location filming scenes from Wayne's World. Upon entering the station building, park guests passed through a full-scale set of the iconic basement hideout of Wayne and Garth. Since removal of the Paramount references, the queue and station building are loosely themed with the remains of the original theming. Movie-making paraphernalia including stage lights, cameras, props and signs are scattered sparsely about. At Carowinds, some of the original props (notably baby doll pieces) were recycled into the SCarowinds Maze of Madness. Although the Wayne's World theme has been removed from the coaster at Kings Dominion, many signs of the theme were still present until the ride's closure, including many stickers and stamps of the Wayne's World logo around the Hurler station, such as the columns by the exit.

References

External links 

Hurler at Carowinds
Hurler at Kings Dominion
Pictures of Hurler at Carowinds

Carowinds
Roller coasters operated by Cedar Fair
Kings Dominion
Roller coasters in North Carolina
Former roller coasters in Virginia
Roller coasters introduced in 1994
Wayne's World